Vater sein dagegen sehr (English: "Being a father however, is hard") is a 1957 West German film directed by Kurt Meisel.

Plot summary 
One day, writer Lutz Ventura receives news that his sister has died. She leaves behind two children, whom he temporarily takes in after the funeral because Frau Roeckel, the sister of the children's father, deceased five years earlier, is taking a holiday with her husband.

Lutz and the children become good friends. The children want to stay with their uncle, but he does not have much room in his tower apartment, has little money, and wants to get married soon.

The children must return to the Roeckel family, but they run away, because there is always trouble there. The soft-hearted uncle takes them in, but his fiancée has definite ideas about their future, and they don't include other people's children.  On the spur of the moment, she tells him that she no longer wants to marry him.

The writer gets in trouble with the authorities; the children are not allowed to live with him since he is an unmarried man. The situation escalates as the child welfare authorities require the niece and nephew to be ready for transfer to an orphanage that evening.  Lutz goes to the parish priest and explains to him his new idea to seek sanctuary in order to make the public aware of his problem. The priest rejects this but secretly talks to Margot, Lutz's fiancé. She tells the priest that she had been waiting for an opportunity to change her mind and the couple is married on the same day.

Location
The film was shot in rural Franconia, among other locations. The tower is part of the city wall in Sommerhausen. Ventura's marriage took place in the Würzburg Adalberokirche. Cities like Würzburg, Ochsenfurt or Marktbreit pop up in the film repeatedly.

Differences from novel

Reception

– Encyclopedia of the International film

– Protestant film observers [2]

Cast 
Heinz Rühmann as Lutz Ventura
Marianne Koch as Margot Ventura geb. Sonnemann
Hans Leibelt as Pfarrer Miesbach
Paul Esser as Friedrich Roeckel
Edith Schollwer as Ottilie Roeckel geb. Lüdecke
Agnes Windeck as Fürsorgerin
Hans Waldemar Anders as Schulvorsteher
Luigi Malipiero as Briefträger
Franz-Otto Krüger as Standesbeamter
Kurt Meisel as Schneider
Maren Bielenberg as Gertrud "Traudl" Lüdecke
Rolf Pinegger as Rudi Lüdecke (boy)

Soundtrack

External links 

1957 films
1957 comedy-drama films
German comedy-drama films
West German films
1950s German-language films
Films directed by Kurt Meisel
Films based on German novels
1957 comedy films
1957 drama films
1950s German films